The archaeological site of Al-Ashoosh is a third-millennium BC settlement located  south of Dubai in the United Arab Emirates (UAE). It stands as a rare example of human occupation in the Rub' al Khali during the Umm al-Nar period. Archaeologists believe Al-Ashoosh was a seasonal settlement occupied by a hunter/pastoral community, probably occupying structures of perishable materials, during the second half of the third millennium BC (2500—2000 BC). It is thought the water table would have been higher, supporting inland settlement in what is now a plain and arid site  with a brackish well. The site was used for the production of stone tools.

The site
Dubai Municipality and the Sanisera Archaeology Institute conducted excavations at the site between November 2015 and May 2016.

Surveys in the area by Dubai Municipality and the Department of Antiquities of Jordan identified 33 archaeological sites ranging in date from prehistory to the late Islamic period. In 2006–2007, more-detailed archaeological investigations of the area of Al-Ashoosh were conducted, including survey, excavation and geological sampling. 

The site is divided into two distinct parts, dubbed areas A and B. Area A, the main area, covers some 350m² and represents a single-phase rubbish midden located on a natural sand dune. It has yielded a large amount of material including faunal remains, lithics, charcoal and a small quantity of pottery. There is no evidence of any structure at the site. Carbon dating of recovered materials dates the site to the Umm Al Nar  period.

50m to the southwest, Area B has revealed eight ovens, constructed of irregular clay rings sloping down to bases of the structures that sit directly on the bedrock. These are thought to be a type of tannour. Almost 300kg of faunal remains were recovered during digs at Al-Ashoosh. 

Finds at the site include unusual seals with links to Dilmun, stone tools and pottery of the black-on-red Umm Al Nar type.

See also
 List of Ancient Settlements in the UAE

References

Archaeological sites in the United Arab Emirates
Geography of Dubai (emirate)
History of Dubai